Ronalds Arājs (born 29 November 1987 in Tukums) is a Latvian athlete. Arājs is the current Latvian record holder in the 100 metres sprint, having a personal best of 10.18 seconds. His personal record in the 200 metres is 20.75 seconds.

Arājs represented Latvia at the 2008 Summer Olympics in Beijing. He competed at the 200 metres and placed fifth in his first round heat in a time of 21.22 seconds, which was not fast enough to qualify for the second round.

He has expressed his intentions of converting towards bobsleigh after the 2012 Summer Olympics in London.

References

External links
 
 Team Latvia roster, page 8

1987 births
Living people
People from Tukums
Latvian male sprinters
Athletes (track and field) at the 2008 Summer Olympics
Olympic athletes of Latvia